Our Place is an American not-for-profit organization (a "501(c) organization") created to bring awareness of teen substance abuse, and to assist, rehabilitate and mentor  troubled Jewish adolescents and children.

History
Our Place was established in 1998 in response to increased incidences of substance abuse, suicide and death among teenagers and young adults in Jewish communities in the New York City region. It was started as a safe  haven or hang out for at-risk young  people and now employs a multi-faceted approach to counseling, rehabilitating and guiding troubled youth. Members are sponsored for trips to Israel, around the New York City region, and the United States.	 

The organization targets young men and women, primarily between the ages of 15 - 25. It works primarily with youth from the greater New York City metropolitan area who have dropped out of high school. Additionally,  its worldwide network assists youth in most major Jewish communities.

Fundraising & Events
In 2008 Jackie Mason did a comedy show benefiting Our Place, and to raise awareness of teen substance abuse.

In 2011, Our Place began hosting its annual 5 kilometer run to raise awareness and funding for the organization.  

In 2013 Lipa Schmeltzer created Team Lipa, and ran the annual Our Place 5 km.  

In 2015 Our Place was a part of a weekend in The Hampton Synagogue which is run by Marc Schneier where over 500 people attended a weekend.

References

External links 
 

Jewish charities based in the United States
Jewish youth organizations
Charities based in New York City
Organizations established in 1998
Youth organizations based in the United States